Pedro Esteve (1865–1925) was the leading Spanish anarchist in the United States during his time. Born in Barcelona, he joined the Catalan anarchists and wrote for the anarchist paper El Productor. He emigrated to the United States in the 1890s and was involved in organizing seamen, miners, and cigarmakers in New York, Colorado, and Florida. Esteve edited the American anarchist papers La Questione Sociale and Cultura Obrera. He married the anarchist Maria Roda and frequently worked with Emma Goldman, serving as her translator.

References

Further reading 

 
 
 
 
 

American anarchists
Spanish anarchists
1865 births
1925 deaths
People from Barcelona
Anarchists from Catalonia
Spanish translators
Emma Goldman